Metacinnabar is the cubic form of mercury sulfide (HgS). It is the high temperature form and trimorphous with cinnabar (trigonal structure) and the higher temperature hypercinnabar (hexagonal structure). It occurs with cinnabar in mercury deposits and is associated with native mercury, wurtzite, stibnite, marcasite, realgar, calcite, barite,
chalcedony and hydrocarbons.

It was first described in 1870 for an occurrence in the Redington mine, Knoxville, Napa County, California.

References

Mercury(II) minerals
Sulfide minerals
Cubic minerals
Minerals in space group 216
Minerals described in 1870